The 1971–72 season was Derby County's 72nd in the Football League and their 45th season in the top flight. They won their first ever league title to qualify for the 1972–73 European Cup, as well as winning the Texaco Cup. In addition, their reserve side won the Central League for the first time since 1936.

Season summary
Derby began the season with an unbeaten League run of five wins and seven draws although they did exit the League Cup at the second round stage, beaten 2–0 in a replay at Leeds. Defeat at leaders Manchester United in their 13th match triggered a period of inconsistent league form that saw Derby lose five times in 11 matches, the last at Elland Road just after Christmas, but they lost just one of their next 13 and a 2–0 victory against Leeds at the Baseball Ground over Easter took them to the top of the table. They remained there despite losing to Newcastle in the next match, their only home defeat of the season, and then drawing with West Bromwich Albion but had now played a game more than the three teams below them (Leeds, Liverpool and Manchester City) with only two points separating the four.

Two victories followed but defeat at Manchester City in their penultimate match of the campaign saw Derby slip to third with the title race still wide open. City, having completed their fixtures, now led the table on 57 points but could no longer win the league, with Derby and second-placed Liverpool both a point behind and separated only by goal average. Crucially, the two would meet at the Baseball Ground in Derby's final match although the Reds still had a further game in hand. Leeds lay fourth on 55 points, also with two matches remaining and a superior goal average to the other challengers.

Derby ended their season by beating Liverpool 1–0, John McGovern netting the winner, leaving them on 58 points with Leeds (who beat Chelsea 2–0 on the same night) on 57 and Liverpool on 56. Derby's destiny was not in their own hands and they left the country to escape the pressure - Brian Clough holidayed with his family in the Isles of Scilly while Peter Taylor went to Majorca with the players. Leeds needed a draw and Liverpool a win to overtake Derby.

In the event, Wolverhampton Wanderers beat Leeds 2–1 at Molineux and Liverpool could only manage a 0–0 draw at Arsenal. The league was unusually close throughout the campaign and the final table saw Derby champions just one point ahead of the teams in 2nd (Leeds), 3rd (Liverpool) and 4th (City).

Clough had built a balanced team at Derby, one in which every player knew his job. They rarely swept away the opposition, instead building on the foundations of a strong defence, although there were some memorable performances, notably in 4–0 defeats of Stoke and Nottingham Forest at the Baseball Ground and away to Sheffield United.

Although Derby reached the FA Cup fifth round, losing 1–0 to eventual runners-up Arsenal in a second replay at Filbert Street, their primary cup success for 1971–72 came in the Texaco Cup, a competition between sixteen English, Scottish and Irish clubs who were not in European competition. With home gates consistently over 20,000, Derby beat Dundee United (8–5 on aggregate), Stoke (4–3 agg.) and Newcastle (4–2 agg.) before playing Airdrieonians in the final. After a 0–0 draw at Broomfield Park, Derby beat their Scottish opponents 2–1 in the second leg at the Baseball Ground with Roger Davies, signed for £12,000 the previous summer from non-league Worcester City, grabbing the decisive goal to give Derby their second cup win in as many seasons.

Record signing defender Colin Todd claimed the club's Player of the Year while Alan Hinton finished the season as top scorer with 15 goals. Kevin Hector netted his 100th for the club in a 6–0 FA Cup fourth round win over Notts County and Alan Durban became the club's most capped international, overtaking Sammy Crooks, with his 27th and final appearance for Wales. Steve Powell became Derby's youngest ever player, a record he held for almost 30 years, when he made his debut in a Texaco Cup tie against Stoke aged just 16 years and 30 days.

Squad
Substitute appearances indicated in brackets

League table

Results

First Division

Football League Cup

Texaco Cup

FA Cup

References
Results database from Soccerbase

1971-72
English football clubs 1971–72 season
1971-72